Radio for the Print Handicapped (RPH also known as Radio Print Handicapped Network) services was started as a part of Melbourne's 3ZZ service in 1975. It was during this time that Radio 4RPH founder, Spero Dragona, first held a public forum in Brisbane to discuss starting something similar in Brisbane.

In 1978, the Minister for Post and Telecommunications put the might of the government behind the idea and announced funding for “special radio communications service for the blind and other people with reading difficulties.” With this funding Queensland Radio for the Print Handicapped Limited was established and started broadcasting the daily newspapers for an hour each morning on Classical community radio station 4MBS.

Spero kept pushing for the station to have a signal of its own and his persistence paid off. In February 1984, Radio 4RPH launched as its own dedicated radio service. Currently, the station broadcasts on 1296AM, DAB+, and streams online. The organisation is a not-for-profit charity business that uses grants, sponsorship, and donations to operate

Historically, Radio 4RPH catered to an over 60s, vision impaired, and blind communities. However, in 2017 the station began its most ambitious reinvention. The mission of creating a station that continued its historical purpose of creating informative content for those with a print disability, but also expanding the station's reach to more communities. “Empowerment through Information” was chosen as the new motto to reflect that Radio 4RPH was not passively delivering its audience the news but engaging them through it. It is becoming more accessible and community-driven than ever before.

The station started from the ground up, improving the station's Spring Hill Studios by replacing the 30 plus-year-old equipment, rebranding the station with a new logo and signage, restructuring the organisation, and engaging with its volunteers, members, and community in ways never thought possible

In 2019, the station rebranded to Reading Radio 4RPH as a temporary brand change on our way to our current name Reading Radio.

See also
 List of radio stations in Australia
 Radio Print Handicapped Network

References

External links
 
 Live online streaming service

Radio stations in Brisbane
Radio reading services of Australia
Radio stations established in 1990
1990 establishments in Australia